The Kazakh Air Defense Forces () is the aviation warfare branch of the Armed Forces of the Republic of Kazakhstan. Their responsibilities include protecting Kazakh airspace, as well as combat missions in support of other branches of the armed forces. The official holiday of the air forces is Aviation Day on August 18.

The Talgat Bigeldinov Military Institute of the Air Defence Forces serves as the only educational service of the air force, having trained cadets from foreign countries including Hungary, Kyrgyzstan and Afghanistan.

History

Soviet era
In the first formation of the Central Asian Military District, it operated a Soviet Air Force district branch led by Major General M.P. Kharitonov. It operated in the early to mid-40s during the Second World War, and consisted of air brigades based on the territory of the Kazakh SSR. The Central Asian Military District was reinstated in 1969 in relation with the increased hostility between the USSR and the People's Republic of China, by splitting the territories of the Kazakh SSR, Kyrgyzstan SSR and the Tajik SSR from the Turkestan Military District. The 73rd Air Army provided all air support for the district, being known as the Air Forces of the Central Asian Military District from 1980 to 1988. Air defence was also provided by the 12th and 14th Air Defence Armies. In 1989 the military district was disbanded, being merged back into the Turkestan MD. This led to the amalgamation of the 73rd Air Army into the 49th Air Army of the TurkMD. The new air army inherited the headquarters of the 49th, but has taken the designation of the 73rd, so while air force units were nominally still subordinated to the 73rd AA, this was not the one of the CAMD with its HQ in Almaty, but another formation with its HQ in Tashkent.

Post-independence
At the time of the declaration of the independence of Kazakhstan and the dissolution of the Soviet Union, the 24th Fighter-Bomber Aviation Division, as well as three other separate air regiments, were stationed in the country. On May 7, 1992, a meeting was held in Almaty between Russian and Kazakh government representatives and an agreement was reached for the transfer of all units and formations of the Turkestan Military District, to the authority of Kazakhstan. On the same day President Nursultan Nazarbayev signed a decree for the transformation of the State Committee of Defence of the Republic of Kazakhstan into the Ministry of Defence, and for the creation of the Armed Forces of the Republic of Kazakhstan. For the Air Force this included the following units:

 from the 73rd Air Army (73-я Воздушная армия):
 11th Guards Dnepropetrovskaya, awarded the Order of the Red Banner and the Order of Bogdan Khmelnytskiy Mixed Aviation Division (11-я гвардейская Днепропетровская Краснознамённая ордена Богдана Хмельницкого смешанная авиационная дивизия) (redesignated in 1989 from its previous designation as the 24th Fighter-Bomber Aviation Division (24-я ибад))
 129th Fighter-Bomber Aviation Regiment (129-й истребительно-бомбардировочный авиационный полк) in Taldy Kurgan, flying the MiG-27
 149th Guards Bomber Aviation Regiment (149-й гвардейский бомбардировочный авиационный полк) in Nikolayevka (Zhetigen), flying the Su-24
 905th Fighter Aviation Regiment (905-й истребительный авиационный полк) in Taldy Kurgan, flying the MiG-23MLD
 Separate aviation regiments and squadrons:
 27th Guards Vyborgskiy Red Banner Fighter Aviation Regiment (27-й гвардейский Выборгский Краснознамённый истребительный авиационный полк) in Ucharal, flying MiG-23 and MiG-21 (eventually disbanded in 1992)
 39th Separate Reconnaissance Nikopolksiy, awarded the Order of Alexander Nevsky Aviation Regiment (39-й отдельный разведывательный Никопольский ордена Александра Невского авиационный полк) in Balkhash, flying MiG-25RB and Yak-28R 
 457th Separate Mixed Aviation Regiment (457-й отдельный смешанный авиационный полк) in Almaty, flying An-12, An-26 and Mi-8T
 157th Separate Transport and Combat Helicopter Regiment (157-й отдельный транспортно-боевой вертолетный полк) in Taraz, flying Мi-26, Mi-6 and Mi-8
 486th Separate Helicopter Regiment (486-й отдельный вертолётный полк) in Ucharal, flying Mi-24 and Mi-8
 281st Separate Mixed Helicopter Squadron (281-я отдельная смешанная авиационная эскадрилья) in Almaty, flying Mi-6 and Mi-8
 from the 5th Central Courses for Conversion and Development of Flying Personnel (5-е Центральные курсы по подготовке и усовершенствованию авиационных кадров (5 ЦК ПУАК)), a training air division under Air Force High Command, consisted of four aircraft and one helicopter training aviation regiment, HQ in Frunze (Kyrgyz SSR),
 715th Training Aviation Regiment (715-й учебный авиационный полк) in Lugovaya, flying MiG-29 and L-39

The territory of the Kazakh SSR was provided air defence by two separate armies of the Air Defence Forces and the Kazakh military took control over their Kazakhstan-based assets:

 from the 14th Independent Air Defence Army which had its HQ in Novosibirsk and provided air defence cover over the central regions of the USSR, spanning from the Arctic Ocean to the Kazakh steppe):
 56th Corps of Air Defence (56-й корпус ПВО, HQ in Semipalatinsk) (3 of its regiments were transferred to the Russian military and re-located to Russian territory):
 356th Fighter Aviation Regiment of Air Defence (356-й иап ПВО) in Semipalatinsk, flying MiG-31
 120th Missile Air Defence Regiment (120-й зрп) in Semipalatinsk (Chagan village)
 374th Guards Missile Air Defence Regiment (374-й гвзрп) in Serebryanоk
 770th Missile Air Defence Regiment (770-й зрп) in Georgievka
 17th Radio-Technical Regiment (17-й ртп) in Semipalatinsk
 from the 12th Independent Air Defense Army (12-я отдельная армия ПВО), had its HQ in Tashkent, Uzbek SSR and provided air defence for the Central Asian Soviet republics and the forces of the Turkestan Military District):
 37th Corps of Air Defence (37-й корпус ПВО, HQ in Almaty) (1 radio-technical brigade on Kyrgyz territory transferred to the Kyrgyz military):
 87th Missile Air Defence Brigade (87-я зрбр) in Almaty
 420th Missile Air Defence Regiment (420-й зрп) in Karaganda
 561st Guards Missile Air Defence Regiment (561-й гвзрп) in Shevchenko
 769th Guards Missile Air Defence Regiment (769-й гвзрп) in Baikonur 
 1022nd Missile Air Defence Regiment (1022-й зрп) in Sary-Shagan (the former 51st Missile Air Defence Brigade)
 42nd Radio-Technical Brigade (42-я ртбр) in Almaty

The Armed Forces of the Republic of Kazakhstan have also inherited an army aviation unit.

 from the 32nd Combined Arms Red Banner Army (32-я общевойсковая Краснознамённая армия, HQ in Semipalatinsk):
 450th Separate Helicopter Regiment (450-й отдельный вертолётный полк) in Ucharal

Directly subordinated to the General Staff of the Armed Forces of the USSR:

 27th Separate Helicopter Squadron (27-я отдельная вертолётная эскадрилья) in Semipalatinsk, providing air support to the Semipalatinsk Test Site

The air defence and the army aviation units were kept separate from the air force, but by the time the Kazakhstan Air Defence Forces were established on 1 June 1998 they were merged into it.

By late 1993 the small Kazakh Air Force consisted of a six regiments as well as an air defence fighter regiment.

It included the following units:

11th Division
129th Fighter-Bomber Regiment (Taldy Kurgan)
134th Fighter-Bomber Regiment (Zhangiztobe)
149th Bomber Regiment (Zhetigen/Nikolayevka)
715th Fighter Regiment
39th Reconnaissance Regiment (Balkhash Airport)
486th Helicopter Regiment (Ucharal)
356th Fighter Aviation Regiment (Semipalatinsk), led notably by Major General Aliy Petrovich Volkov

Creation of Kazakh Air Defence Forces 

On 17 November 1997, President Nursultan Nazarbayev issued a decree titled "On Further Measures for Reforming the Armed Forces of the Republic of Kazakhstan". As instructed by this, on 1 April 1998, Minister of Defense Sagadat Nurmagambetov, announced the creation of the Air Defense Forces of the Armed Forces, with the first day of operation being 1 June 1998. On 17 April 2008, the Commander-in-Chief of the Air Defense Forces announced August 18 would be celebrated as 'Aviation Day.'

In November 2007, Kazakhstan signed an agreement with Belarus, under which 10 Soviet-made Su-27 fighters were modernised at an aircraft repair plant in Baranavichy, designated for the Kazakh Air Defence Forces. In 2008, EADS agreed titanium sourcing agreements with Kazakh suppliers. On 28 October 2010, Eurocopter created a 50/50 joint venture with Kazakhstan Engineering, under which 45 Eurocopter EC145s would be assembled locally for government use. The first of six EC145s ordered by the Kazakh Ministries of Defence and Emergencies was delivered in November 2011.

In early January 2012, Airbus Military and the state-owned Kazspecexport defence company, signed a contract to deliver two EADS CASA C-295 military transport aircraft, and a Memorandum of Understanding for another six aircraft, which were to be delivered over the course of the following year. In May 2012, Kazakhstan announced its intent to acquire 20 Eurocopter EC725 helicopters that were to be assembled in Astana by officials from Kazakhstan Engineering and fitted by the Turkish firm Aselsan.

Commander
Mukhamedzhan Ibraev (1996 — 2000)
Kopen Akhmadiev (2001 — 2007)
Alexander Sorokin (17 September 2007 — 27 June 2013)
Nurlan Ormanbetov (27 June 2013 — 2 October 2017)
Nurlan Karbenov (2 October 2017 — 16 March 2020)
Nurlan Ormanbetov (since 16 March 2020)

Aircraft

Current inventory

Structure
The general composition of the Air and Air Defence Force is as follows:

Military Aviation
Air Defence Forces
Center for Parachute Training
Air Traffic Control Center

Today the Air and Air Defence Force has four jet bases:

600th Guards Air Base (Zhetigen, Nikolayevka, Almaty)
602nd Air Base (Chimkent)
604th Air Base (Taldykorgan Airport)
610th Air Base (Sary-Arka Airport, Karaganda)

References

 
Military aviation in Asia
Military units and formations established in 1998